The following events occurred in April 1959:

April 1, 1959 (Wednesday)
Kazuo Inamori founded worldwide office copy complex machine and solar panel brand Kyocera in Japan; the predecessor name was Kyoto Ceramic.
After the Soviet Union restricted travel of American diplomats, the U.S. did the same for the Soviets in America.
John W. Crowley, Director of Aeronautical and Space Research, appointed Harry J. Goett of the Ames Research Center to head a Research Steering Committee on Manned Space Flight to assist NASA Headquarters in long-range planning and basic research on human spaceflight. Composed of representatives from the field centers as well as Headquarters, members of the Goett Committee (as it was called) met for the first time on 25-26 May. From the outset, they agreed to concentrate on the long-range objectives of NASA's human spaceflight program, including supporting research required, coordinating the research efforts of the various field centers, and recommending specific research projects and vehicle development programs. The most important task facing the Goett Committee was the issue of a flight program to follow Project Mercury. H. Kurt Strass of the Space Task Group (STG) at Langley Field, Virginia (the field element that would ultimately evolve into what is now the Johnson Space Center), described some preliminary ideas of STG planners regarding a follow-on to Mercury: (1) an enlarged Mercury capsule to place two astronauts in orbit for three days; (2) a two-person Mercury capsule and a large cylindrical structure to support a two-week mission. (In its 1960 budget, NASA had requested $2 million to study methods of constructing a crewed orbiting laboratory or converting the Mercury spacecraft into a two-person laboratory for extended space missions.)
The Navajo Nation Supreme Court came into existence, along with a set of district courts with jurisdiction in Navajo territory in Arizona and New Mexico.
A U.S. Air Force cargo plane crashed at Orting, Washington, killing all four of the crew on board. Witnesses reported that the C-118 had collided with another object in midair, and the incident has become part of UFO lore. The pilot, Lt. Robert R. Dimmick, radioed, "We have hit something, or something has hit us", moments before the crash.

April 2, 1959 (Thursday)
The Soviet Union's Council for Russian Orthodox Church Affairs advised the Russian Orthodox patriarch of new measures to reduce the number of convents, followed by property and income tax increases on the convents.
Project Mercury:
The National Aeronautics and Space Administration (NASA) completed the selection of seven men as astronauts for Project Mercury. Originally planning to select six men, the Space Task Group screened 508 records and found 110 candidates who met the minimum standards, interviewed 69, invited 32 to go through tests and narrowed the number down to 18. Deputy Administrator Robert Gilruth suggested picking the seven finalists with the most flying experience.
A preliminary briefing was conducted for prospective bidders on construction of the worldwide tracking range for Project Mercury. This meeting was attended by representatives from 20 companies. At this time the preliminary plan called for an orbital mission tracking network of 14 sites. Contacts had not been made with the governments of any of the proposed locations with the exception of Bermuda. It was planned that all the sites would have facilities for telemetry, voice communications with the pilot, and teletype (wire or radio) communications with centers in the United States for primary tracking. The tracking sites would provide the control center at Cape Canaveral, Florida, with trajectory predictions; landing-area predictions; and vehicle, systems, and pilot conditions.
Between April 2 and April 16:
NASA and the military services conducted meetings to draft final plans for the Project Mercury animal payload program. The animal program was planned to cover nine flights, involving Little Joe, Redstone, Jupiter, and Atlas launch vehicles.
An initial orientation was given to the seven Project Mercury astronauts when they reported to the Space Task Group for duty.
After responsibility for the worldwide tracking range construction of Project Mercury had been assumed by the Langley Research Center, the following study contracts were placed: (1) Aeronutronic to study radar coverage and trajectory computation requirements, (2) RCA Service Corporation for specification writing, (3) Lincoln Laboratories for consultant services and proposal evaluations, and (4) Space Electronics for the design of the control center at Cape Canaveral.
The Chief of Naval Operations directed the Atlantic Fleet to support Project Mercury as follows: (1) landing and recovery systems in the area of Norfolk, Virginia, to develop spacecraft pickup and handling techniques for ships and helicopters, (2) recovery of capsules on solid rocket launch vehicle tests in the area of Wallops Island, and (3) Atlas launch vehicle development or ballistic flights from the Atlantic Missile Range. Details for orbital flight support had not been accomplished at that time.
Born: Juha Kankkunen, Finnish rally car driver and four-time world champion; in Laukaa

April 3, 1959 (Friday)
Vito Genovese, New York Mafia don and boss of the Genovese Crime Family, was convicted on federal narcotics conspiracy charges, but was released three days later after posting $150,000 bond.
Elmer David Bruner died in the electric chair at the West Virginia Penitentiary in Moundsville, West Virginia, becoming the last person to be executed in that state, which abolished the death penalty in 1965.
Born: David Hyde Pierce, American television actor known for Frasier; in Saratoga Springs, New York

April 4, 1959 (Saturday)
In a speech at Gettysburg College, U.S. President Dwight D. Eisenhower announced the first American commitment to keeping South Vietnam as a separate, non-Communist nation. "We reach the inescapable conclusion", said Eisenhower, "that our own national interests demand some help from us in sustaining in Vietnam the morale, the economic progress, and the military strength necessary to its continued existence in freedom."

April 5, 1959 (Sunday)
In Dortmund, West Germany, Rong Guotuan of Communist China defeated Ferenc Sido of Hungary to win the 25th World Table Tennis Championships, becoming the first Chinese player to do so.
At the Southmoor Hotel in Chicago, black nationalist S.A. Davis, Chairman of the Joint Council of Repatriation, and eight of his associates met with George Lincoln Rockwell, white supremacist, and two of his associates in the American Nazi Party, to discuss a joint resolution in support of government-supported "repatriation" of African-Americans to a homeland on the African continent.

April 6, 1959 (Monday)
The Academy Awards ceremony took place at the RKO Pantages Theatre in Hollywood.  Gigi won a record nine Oscars, including the award for Best Picture.
Texas A&M University won in its fight against admitting women as students, as the U.S. Supreme Court dismissed an appeal by two women from a state court decision.
Robert Sobukwe founded the Pan Africanist Congress as a black African alternative to the African National Congress.
Hal Holbrook began his career of portraying a retired author, with his first performance of Mark Twain Tonight! at the Forty-first Street Theatre in Manhattan.
The "escudo" was created as the new currency of the South American nation of Chile, with the signing by President Jorge Alessandri of Law 13,305 in response to runaway inflation. The new escudo was worth 1,000 old pesos, which would be completely replaced by January 1, 1960. The "new peso" would replace the Chilean escudo on September 29, 1975, at a rate of one new peso for every 1,000 escudos (or every one million "old pesos").

April 7, 1959 (Tuesday)
In Washington, the National Safety Council first warned parents about the risk of suffocation posed by plastic bags, particularly those used by dry cleaners. The AMA, as well as a trade association of dry-cleaning stores, joined in the warning. In January, Dr. Paul B. Jarrett of Phoenix had begun a campaign to educate the public after five children had suffocated in the previous year.
The first photograph of a falling meteorite was taken in Pribram, Czechoslovakia.
For the first time, a radar signal was sent between the Earth and the Sun. A team led by Dr. Von R. Eshleman, Lt. Col. Robert C. Barthle, and Dr. Philip B. Gallagher, transmitted the beam from Stanford University in Palo Alto, California, and received the return 17 minutes later. The morning experiments were repeated on April 10 and April 12, and the data was published in the journal Science on February 5, 1960.
By a margin of 386,845 to 314,380 voters in Oklahoma elected to repeal the state's constitutional prohibition on the sale of alcohol, leaving Mississippi as the only dry American state.  Liquor sales began on September 1.
The town of Jackpot, Nevada, was founded.  Located a few miles south of the border with Idaho, the gambling center was created after Idaho banned gambling.
Israel created the first Holocaust Memorial Day by vote of the Knesset in Tel Aviv, to be observed on the 27th day of Nisan, which fell on May 5 in 1959. If the 27th falls on a Friday, the observation is held on the 26th.  In 2009, Nisan 27 was on April 21.
The Philippine government began use of the presidential yacht, the R.P.S. Lapu-Lapu (PY-77).

April 8, 1959 (Wednesday)
 Grace Hopper and others met at the University of Pennsylvania to discuss a computer programming language that would be more applicable to programming for business than FORTRAN. Following the meeting, a task force overseen by Hopper created COmmon Business Oriented Language, or COBOL.
 The Inter-American Development Bank was founded in Washington as an initiative by the Organization of American States to distribute financial aid to OAS member nations.
 As many as 250 delegates to a conference of the AFL-CIO got food poisoning after eating dinner on board a train bound from Toledo to Washington.
 One day before the press conference introducing the members of NASA Astronaut Group 1, USAF test pilot Capt. Halvor M. Ekeren, Jr., who had been one of the 32 astronaut finalists earlier in the year, died in the crash of his Convair JF-106A-50 Delta Dart near Indian Springs AFB in Nevada.
 Died: Marios Makrionitis, 45, Roman Catholic Archbishop of Athens, was killed in an automobile accident.

April 9, 1959 (Thursday)

NASA Administrator T. Keith Glennan introduced the seven Mercury astronauts at a press conference in Washington, D.C. By rank, they were Lt. Col. John Glenn, Lieutenant Commanders Wally Schirra and Alan Shepard, Air Force Captains Gordon Cooper, Gus Grissom and Deke Slayton, and Navy Lt. Scott Carpenter.
On April 9 and 10, investigations of two escape configurations for Mercury spacecraft were conducted in a  transonic circuit at the Arnold Engineering Development Center, Tullahoma, Tennessee, for determination of static stability and drag characteristics of the configurations.
The first hijacking of an airliner to Cuba took place after six Haitian rebels killed the pilot of a Coahata Airlines flight bound from Aux Cayes to Port-au-Prince, then flew the DC3 to Havana.
Comedian Lenny Bruce made his national television debut, as a guest on The Steve Allen Show.
The Boston Celtics beat the Minneapolis Lakers 118–113 to sweep the four-game NBA championship series, in the first of the Celtics-Lakers title matches.
Actor George Reeves, who portrayed Superman on television, was injured when the brakes failed on his Jaguar automobile, and he crashed into a light pole near his home in Beverly Hills. Reeves suffered regular headaches after the accident, and would die from a gunshot wound on June 16.

Died: Frank Lloyd Wright, 91, American architect, died in Phoenix, three days after intestinal surgery.

April 10, 1959 (Friday)

She was the first commoner to marry into the Imperial House of Japan. After the wedding, Kensetsu Makayama, 19, tried to climb into the royal coach after throwing a rock at the couple.
Thirty-four people, mostly children, were killed by a bomb left over from World War II. Fishermen had retrieved the  weapon from a sunken ship in Lingayen Gulf near Dagupan in the Philippines, and were taking apart the device while curious onlookers watched.
Escape-motor canting-angle tests for Project Mercury were completed at Wallops Island. Tests were conducted in 5-degree increments between 10 degrees to 30 degrees, and visually it appeared stability was better at the larger angle.
A sniper attempted to shoot Virginia Governor J. Lindsay Almond outside the Executive Mansion in Richmond. The Governor was unhurt, and the would-be assassin was not found.
Born:
Kenneth "Babyface" Edmonds, songwriter/musician; in Indianapolis
Brian Setzer, American rock musician for the band Stray Cats; in Massapequa, New York
Died: Leonard Shockley, 17, became the last juvenile to be executed in the United States. For nearly 40 years, he would also be the last person to be executed for a crime committed as a minor. On February 4, 1999, Sean Sellers would be put to death in Oklahoma for a 1985 murder committed when he was 16.

April 11, 1959 (Saturday)
William H. Pickering, director of the Jet Propulsion Laboratory, announced America's plans for a manned lunar mission "within the next 5 to 10 years".  Speaking to a group of Caltech alumni, Pickering said that the Nova rocket, once perfected, would "be able to transport two or three men to the moon and return them to earth."

April 12, 1959 (Sunday)
The body of former Haitian presidential candidate Clement Jumelle was hijacked from the funeral procession in Port-au-Prince. It has been speculated that Haitian dictator François Duvalier wanted to use the brain in a voodoo ceremony.
The myth of the Chinese word for "crisis" was perpetuated by Senator John F. Kennedy, who said, "When written in Chinese, the word crisis is composed of two characters—one represents danger and the other represents opportunity."
Tests were in progress at Langley in which an aluminium honeycomb structure was used partially to absorb the Mercury spacecraft impact load. Robert R. Gilruth, Project Mercury Director, had stated his belief of this requirement on January 16, 1959.
Space Task Group conducted the second full-scale beach abort test on Wallops Island. Lift-off was effected cleanly, and a slow pitch started during the burning of the escape rocket motor. The tower separated as scheduled and the drogue and main parachutes deployed as planned. The test was fully successful.

April 13, 1959 (Monday)
The United States and Britain asked the Soviet Union to join in a moratorium on above-ground nuclear weapons testing.
Singer Mario Lanza gave his final concert, in Kiel, West Germany. He would die on October 7 of the same year.
Two small-scale spacecraft escape-tower combinations were launched successfully at Wallops Island, and on the next day a full-scale spacecraft escape system was launched. The complete sequence of events - escape system firing, escape tower jettisoning, parachute deployment, landing, and helicopter recovery - was satisfactory.
NASA placed a request with the Navy for the use of its Aviation Medical Acceleration Laboratory at Johnsville, Pennsylvania. NASA desired to use the laboratory's AMAL human centrifuge in support of the Mercury astronaut training program.
Rear Admiral J. W. Gannon was appointed by Donald A. Quarles, U.S. Deputy Secretary of Defense, to head a Department of Defense group to study with NASA the recovery aspects of Project Mercury.
The capsule was successfully ejected but lost after a timing error sent it to Norway rather than Hawaii.
Died: Eduard van Beinum, 57, Dutch conductor, collapsed of a heart attack while rehearsing with the Concertgebouw Orchestra in Amsterdam. Van Beinum was reportedly leading the orchestra in playing Brahms' First Symphony in C Minor "when he lowered his baton and called for a pause", then fell to the floor.

April 14, 1959 (Tuesday)
The Robert A. Taft Memorial, a carillon with 27 bells, was dedicated in Washington. President Eisenhower and former president Hoover delivered remarks before a crowd of 5,000 people.
The Atlas D missile was launched from Cape Canaveral in its first test. The rocket exploded soon after launch, as did two other Atlas D launches, until succeeding on July 29, 1959.
The Grumman OV-1 Mohawk, built as the U.S. Army's reconnaissance airplane, made its first flight.

April 15, 1959 (Wednesday)
Four men hijacked a Cuban airliner to the United States.
Fidel Castro arrived in Washington for an 11-day tour of the United States.
U.S. Secretary of State John Foster Dulles resigned after the metastasizing of his abdominal cancer. Choking back tears, President Dwight D. Eisenhower announced the news at a press conference in Augusta, Georgia.
Ground-instrumentation requirements for firing Little Joe test vehicles at Wallops Island were drafted. These requirements involved pulse radars, camera, Doppler radar, wind-monitoring instruments, telemetry equipment, and a ground destruct system.
Carr rescheduled the launch several times, but it never took place.
Born: Emma Thompson, English actress, in Paddington, London

April 16, 1959 (Thursday)
The crew glided the plane the rest of the way.
The United States deployed the first Thor missiles in Great Britain, under the command of Royal Air Force crews. The nuclear warheads on the missiles remained under American control.
NASA and the military services held a meeting to discuss the search and recovery aspects of Project Mercury. Admiral Gannon, the service spokesman, stated that the meeting was exploratory but that the Navy and other services would support the project.
Space Task Group, Langley Research Center, and Lewis Research Center personnel met to discuss development plans regarding construction and instrumentation of Big Joe Number I reentry spacecraft test vehicle. During the course of this meeting, milestone objectives of the work to be accomplished were drafted.
NASA requested that the Air Force furnish two TF-102B and two T-33 aircraft to be used by the Project Mercury astronauts. One of the requirements in the astronaut training program was to maintain proficiency in high performance aircraft.
Voters in Harlem Heights, a neighborhood near Chicago, elected in a referendum to incorporate as the city of Palos Heights, Illinois.
Rioters at the Montana State Prison in Deer Lodge took 16 guards and 7 other people hostage. The disturbance broke out at 4:30. Two hostages were released the next day.
"Judgment at Nuremberg" was telecast as a live television broadcast on Playhouse 90 and was then adapted to a 1961 film.

April 17, 1959 (Friday)
Twenty-six people died in the crash of a Mexican C-46 airplane, en route from Mexicali to Guayama. The Tigres Voladores Airlines plane exploded in midair as it made its approach.
Born: Sean Bean, English actor; in Handsworth, South Yorkshire

April 18, 1959 (Saturday)

The Corvette Stingray was introduced, racing at Marlboro Raceway and finishing in fourth place.
The Montreal Canadiens beat the Toronto Maple Leafs 5–3 to win their fourth straight Stanley Cup, in the fifth game of the series.
At 3:45 a.m., fifty members of the Montana National Guard stormed the Montana State Prison at Deer Lodge, rescued the 16 remaining hostages, and ended the prison revolt there after 36 hours.

April 19, 1959 (Sunday)
For the first time in Switzerland's history, a woman was allowed to cast a vote. Although the nation's male voters had rejected universal suffrage on February 1, the Swiss canton of Vaud approved female participation in local elections. Mrs. Ida Pidoux became the first woman to exercise the new right, casting a ballot for candidates of her choice in Oulens-sur-Lucens.
Fidel Castro appeared on Meet the Press and denied that Cuba would turn to communism. Later that day, the Cuban premier met with U.S. Vice-President Richard M. Nixon.
Born: Donald Markwell, Australian social scientist and educator, and Warden of Rhodes House, Oxford; in Quilpie, Queensland
Died: Alfred Steele, 57, Chairman of the Pepsi Cola Company and husband of Joan Crawford. Christina Crawford would later claim, in an updated version of Mommie Dearest, that she believed that her mother murdered her stepfather.

April 20, 1959 (Monday)
The Ilyushin Il-18, a turboprop airliner that could carry 95 passengers, was put into service by the Soviet national airline, Aeroflot.

The pilot for what would become the ABC television series The Untouchables was first shown, appearing in the first of two installments as part of the Westinghouse Desilu Playhouse anthology series CBS.  The show was based on the autobiography of retired federal agent Eliot Ness, whose role was played by actor Robert Stack.  The ABC network picked up the contract to make a regular series that would premiere on October 15.
Born: Clint Howard, American film and television actor; in Burbank, California
Died: Morris K. Jessup, 59, American mathematician, astronomer, and authority on UFOs, was found dead in his car from carbon monoxide poisoning, an apparent suicide, although some conspiracy theorists believe that he was murdered.

April 21, 1959 (Tuesday)
Alfred Dean set a record by catching a  great white shark off the coast of Ceduna, South Australia.
The tradition of a cannon firing at noon in Rome was started again after a 20-year hiatus.

April 22, 1959 (Wednesday)
In a game between the Kansas City Athletics and the Chicago White Sox, the Sox scored 11 runs in the seventh inning on only one base hit, and went on to win 20–6. John Callison singled to bring in two players who had reached base on Athletics' errors. After the bases were loaded, eight other players (including Callison) scored from third base by a player being walked, while another scored from third after a batter was struck by a pitch.
In 1955, Florence Houteff, whose husband Victor had founded the Branch Davidian sect in Waco, Texas, had predicted that God would establish the Kingdom of Palestine on April 22, 1959. The prophecy failed, but the Davidians continued, dying in a fire at Waco in 1993.
Norman Rosen filed a patent for the mesh crib bumper, designed to prevent infant suffocation by providing an alternative to the traditional cloth or vinyl sides within a crib. Rosen would receive U.S. Patent No. 3,018,492 on January 30, 1962, for his invention.

In a meeting at Langley, NASA officials concluded that the tower configuration was the best escape system for the Mercury spacecraft and development would proceed using this concept. However, limited studies of alternate configurations would continue.
The second of two recording dates of Miles Davis' Kind of Blue at Columbia Records' 30th Street Studio in New York City.
Born: Ryan Stiles, American comedian; in Seattle

April 23, 1959 (Thursday)
On April 23 and 24, a meeting was held at Langley to coordinate the activities of individuals who would be engaged in handling, reducing, and analyzing data received from the Big Joe spacecraft. Procedures for data pickup and for supplying the information to the appropriate installation were established. A majority of the data reduction workload was carried out by the Lewis Research Center and the Space Task Group.
The press secretary for Ernesto de la Guardia, the President of Panama, charged that American actor John Wayne was financing an attempt by Roberto Arias to overthrow the government there. Wayne dismissed the accusations as ridiculous, and noted, "Roberto never talked politics, and I never heard him say anything about overthrowing the Panamanian government."

April 24, 1959 (Friday)
The 34 Shan States were merged into one region by the government of Burma (now Myanmar).
The bond graph was invented, described as "one of the most effective and most elegant tools for modeling system dynamics".
DeMarquis D. Wyatt, Assistant to the Director of Space Flight Development, testified before Congress in support of a NASA request for $3 million in Fiscal Year 1960 for research into techniques and problems of space rendezvous. He explained what these funds would be used for. The logistic support of a crewed space laboratory, a possible post-Mercury development, would depend on the resolution of certain key problems to make rendezvous in orbit practical, among them the establishment of referencing methods for fixing the relative positions of two vehicles in space; the development of accurate, lightweight target acquisition equipment to enable the supply craft to locate the space station; the development of very accurate guidance and control systems to permit precise determination of flight paths; and the development of reliable propulsion systems for maneuvering in orbit.
Your Hit Parade was broadcast for the last time.
Died: Omaha, 27, American thoroughbred racehorse and winner of the 1935 Triple Crown, died at the age of 24 on a farm in Nebraska City, Nebraska. The horse was buried somewhere on the Ak-Sar-Ben Raceway grounds, but the location has been lost.

April 25, 1959 (Saturday)
The icebreaker D'Iberville was at the front of 70 ships that would sail from the Atlantic Ocean to Lake Ontario, starting at Montreal. The project had taken five years and cost $475,000,000 with a majority of the funding from Canada. The Seaway was dedicated on June 26, 1959.
At the Nazareth, Pennsylvania, Motor Speedway, 19-year-old Mario Andretti made his racing debut, winning the race in a 1948 Hudson.
In Poplarville, Mississippi, a lynch mob kidnapped 23-year-old Mack Charles Parker from his jail cell. His body was found on May 4 in the Pearl River, where he was thrown after being tortured and killed.
A force of about 80 rebels invaded Panama from the Caribbean Sea in an attempt to overthrow the government there. Although Cuban revolutionary leader Fidel Castro denounced the attack along with other OAS members, it was alleged that he had sponsored the attack.

April 26, 1959 (Sunday)
The Caravelle jet airliner, produced by the French manufacturer Sud Aviation, made its first commercial flight as the SE 210 began service with Scandinavian Airlines System.  
Reds pitcher Willard Schmidt became the first major league baseball player to be hit by a pitch twice in the same inning in a game against the Milwaukee Braves, once by Lew Burdette and once by Bob Rush.  Later, he was struck by a line drive hit by Johnny Logan.  Only two other major leaguers have repeated the result, Frank Thomas of the Mets in 1962, and Brady Anderson in 1999.
Born: 
John Corabi, heavy metal guitarist for Mötley Crüe; in Philadelphia
Pedro Pierluisi, American politician who served as Puerto Rico's non-voting delegate to the United States House of Representatives from 2009 to 2017, and who was sworn in temporarily as Governor of Puerto Rico in August 2019 before his appointment as to the position was annulled five days later; in San Juan, Puerto Rico

April 27, 1959 (Monday)
Liu Shao-chi was named as the new President of the People's Republic of China, as Mao Zedong gave up the ceremonial post to concentrate on the job of First Secretary of the Communist Party.
Philibert Tsiranana was elected the first president of the Malagasy Republic on the island of Madagascar.
At 7:00 a.m. Eastern time, NBC's national broadcasts were shut down by a walkout of engineering personnel. The dispute arose over the planned airing of a Today show segment that had been recorded without union personnel. Programming resumed three hours later.
The radio program One Man's Family was broadcast for the last time, after 27 years on NBC radio.
Project Mercury was accorded the DX priority procurement rating.
The seven Project Mercury astronauts reported for duty and their training program was undertaken immediately.
A tentative schedule of astronaut activities for the first months of training was issued. Actual training began the next day. Within 3 months the astronauts were acquainted with the various facets of the Mercury program. The first training week was as follows: Monday, April 27, check in; April 28, general briefing; April 29, spacecraft configuration and escape methods; April 30, support and restraint; May 1, operational concepts and procedures. These lectures were presented by specialists in the particular field of study. Besides the above, unscheduled activities involved 3 hours flying time and 4 hours of athletics.
On April 27 and 28, the Department of Defense working group on Mercury search and recovery operations met at Patrick Air Force Base, Florida, to establish service responsibilities and support for the first two Mercury-Atlas ballistic flights.
Born: Sheena Easton, Scottish-born pop singer; as Sheena Shirley Orr in Bellshill, North Lanarkshire

April 28, 1959 (Tuesday)
Former President Harry S Truman told students at Columbia University that he had made the decision to drop nuclear weapons on Hiroshima and on Nagasaki because an invasion would have cost millions of lives.
Casa de las Americas was founded in Cuba by order of Fidel Castro.
The Vatican announced that Roman Catholics worldwide would receive dispensation to eat meat on Friday during the May Day holiday.
The U.S. Senate confirmed Clare Boothe Luce as ambassador to Brazil by a 79–11 vote, in spite of efforts by Senator Wayne Morse to block the nomination. In thanking the Senate, Mrs. Luce then caused an uproar when she said in a statement, "My difficulties, of course, go some years back and began when Senator Wayne Morse was kicked in the head by a horse", referring to a 1951 accident in which the Senator's jaw had been broken, and calls were made for her resignation. Ambassador Luce quit on May 1. During the debate, Senator Everett Dirksen made a memorable gaffe in defending Mrs. Luce, saying "Why thresh old straws or beat an old bag of bones?"

April 29, 1959 (Wednesday)
The crash of an Iberia Airlines DC-3 killed all 28 people on board, including Joaquín Blume, 25, the 1957 European gymnastics champion. Blume and four other gymnasts had boarded the flight in Barcelona en route to Madrid and were scheduled to compete in a meet in the Canary Islands.
The Las Vegas Convention Center opened.
The fraternity Phi Kappa Theta was created by the merger of Phi Kappa and Theta Kappa Phi.

April 30, 1959 (Thursday)
The Florianturm, a 720-foot (220-meter) television tower, opened in Dortmund, West Germany, to coincide with an international horticultural festival. Opening that day at the  level was the world's first revolving restaurant.
Félix Houphouët-Boigny was inaugurated as the first African Prime Minister of Côte d'Ivoire.
The Convair B-36 Peacemaker, in operation since 1946, was flown for the last time.
The Lockheed Electra made its first flight, tested for delivery to Western Airlines.
Born: Stephen Harper, 22nd Prime Minister of Canada from 2006 to 2015; in Toronto
Born: Pamela Rabe, Canadian-born Australian stage actress; in Oakville, Ontario.

References

1959
1959-04
1959-04